The Illinois College of Photography and Bissell College of Photo Engraving was a college in Effingham, Illinois opened in 1893 and closed in 1931, with a focus on practical, vocational photographic training.

The college was founded by photographer Lewis H. Bissell, and was located initially on the Austin College campus in Effingham County, Illinois. It later moved to its separate studio and buildings in 1900 at 910–945 Wabash Ave in Effingham. At one time the school had several hundred students from the U.S., Canada and 52 countries.

The college closed in 1931, due to poor enrollment during the Great Depression.

Graduates were expected to "go out fully equipped and the fact that they are alumni of the Illinois College of Photography is a guarantee that they are artists in their lines.  A diploma from this institution assures them the most remunerative positions in the best studios in the country."

Notable graduates
 Fred Hultstrand (1888–1968), graduate 1911
 Edward Weston (1886–1958), attended 1908–1911
 Ellery Valdimir Wilcox (1882–1960)
 Tomar J. Hileman (1882–1945), Glacier National Park photographer
 Avery E. Field (1883-1955), graduated 1906

External links
.
.

References

Education in Effingham County, Illinois
Art education organizations
Vocational education in the United States
History of photography